Maitrī is a dharmic philosophy in Indian religions.

Maitri may also refer to:

Art and entertainment
 Maitri (musician), Dutch heavy metal musician

Science and technology
 Maitri (missile), Indian ballistic missile
 Maitri (research station), Indian research station in Antarctica